Hereford Inlet is an inlet in Cape May County, New Jersey.

Geography
Hereford Inlet separates Seven Mile Island from Five Mile Beach.

It was described in 1834 as,

Hereford Inlet was described in 1878, viz.,

History
Hereford Inlet is labeled as Little Hereford on a circa 1700 map by John Thornton, and by its modern name on a map published in 1749 by Lewis Evans.
The Hereford Inlet Light is a historic lighthouse located in North Wildwood, on the southwestern shore of Hereford Inlet at the north end of Five Mile Beach. Its construction was completed and it became operational in 1874.

Nummy Island, one of the islands near the inlet, is named after Lenape leader King Nummy due to a likely apocryphal tale that Nummy was buried there.

See also 
Seven Mile Island
Five Mile Beach

References 

Inlets of New Jersey
Bodies of water of Cape May County, New Jersey